EFF-Austin was formed in Austin, Texas by Steve Jackson of Steve Jackson Games shortly after the Electronic Frontier Foundation or EFF was formed. Jackson was pursuing a lawsuit, eventually successful, against the Secret Service with EFF's help, and suggested the formation of an alpha EFF chapter in Austin.  Jackson organized a picnic and stood on a picnic table to sound the call for the new organization.  He recruited a smaller group including John Quarterman, Jon Lebkowsky, Bruce Sterling, Smoot Carl-Mitchell, Lar Kaufman and Matt Lawrence to organize the group and serve on the first Board of Directors. The group formed a Texas corporation for EFF-Austin, and became active in discussions of potential chapters for the national organization.  In January 1992, leaders of several potential chapters met with EFF in Atlanta, and learned that EFF had decided not to become a chapters organization. EFF-Austin continued as a separate organization and was active from 1991 through 1997, when it ceased operations following the Supreme Court Reno v. ACLU decision. The organization re-formed in 2001.

External links
EFF-Austin's web site
Article about EFF-Austin at Electric Minds 
EFF and Grassroots Organization by Lar Kaufman 
Technopolitics by Jon Lebkowsky

Internet privacy organizations
Internet-related activism
Intellectual property activism
Non-profit organizations based in Texas
Organizations established in 1991
Defunct privacy organizations
1991 establishments in Texas